La Habra–Fullerton–Yorba Linda Line was a Pacific Electric interurban line which traveled between Los Angeles and Yorba Linda.

History
Construction on the line began under the Los Angeles Inter-Urban Electric Railway between 1906 and 1908 with Pacific Electric assuming control and completing the line between 1909 and 1911. The route was not originally intended to start passenger service until a connection to Corona was complete. Despite that, the line opened as a branch of the Whittier Line by 1911 with service reaching Stern on November 12. Service beyond Yorba Linda was abandoned after August 1, 1930. The route ceased service after January 22, 1938, due to low ridership.

Much of the route remains in service for freight trains. The line between Slauson and Los Nietos forms the Union Pacific La Habra Subdivision, and the segment east of there is an industrial spur which continues as far as Brea. The West Santa Ana Branch Transit Corridor light rail project is expected to use a section of the line between Slauson and the former Los Angeles and Salt Lake Railroad right of way.

Route
The La Habra–Fullerton–Yorba Linda Line followed the Long Beach Line from Los Angeles south to Slauson Junction (south of Slauson Boulevard) where it branched off in an easterly direction to Whittier and Yorba Linda. From there, the double track line ran easterly, in private way between dual roadways of Randolph Street, through Huntington Park, Vernon, Bell, and Maywood to reach the Los Angeles River. Crossing the river, the double track in private way followed intermittent sections of Randolph Street through Bell Gardens and Commerce, and crossed the Rio Hondo south of Slauson Avenue.

The line continued easterly, south and parallel to, Slauson Avenue. Across the Pico Rivera area and the San Gabriel River into Los Nietos, where the line crossed the Atchison, Topeka and Santa Fe Railway Third District main line (Los Nietos) at Norwalk Boulevard. The single track La Habra–Fullerton–Yorba Linda Line branched easterly in private way off the Whittier Line at Los Nietos, crossed Norwalk Boulevard and went through Whittier at the south edge of the city limits. After crossing Mills Avenue the track ran adjacent to and north of Lambert Road until crossing 1st Street. Here the line turned easterly through La Habra to Laon Junction (3rd Avenue at College Street), where the single track Fullerton Line branched to the south.

After crossing Harbor Boulevard the line turned southeasterly still in private way crossed Puente Avenue in Brea, then turned easterly to run through Brea north of the Imperial Highway. The line then turned southeasterly (where the Orange Freeway now crosses over the track) and crossed the Imperial Highway west of Valencia Avenue and ran through Yorba Linda just south of and parallel to Imperial Highway to the terminus at Yorba Linda Boulevard.

Unbuilt connection to Corona
Henry E. Huntington, owner of the Pacific Electric, intended to connect the Whittier Line to the Arlington–Corona Line via Stern and the Santa Ana Canyon. After the Great Merger of 1911, surveys were carried out to establish two routes through the canyon — one on each side of the Santa Ana River.

List of major stations

References

Pacific Electric routes
1911 establishments in California
Railway lines opened in 1911
1938 disestablishments in California
Railway lines closed in 1938
Closed railway lines in the United States